Miyakochi Dam is a gravity dam located in Tokushima prefecture in Japan. The dam is used for flood control and irrigation. The catchment area of the dam is 23.1 km2. The dam impounds about 13  ha of land when full and can store 1350 thousand cubic meters of water. The construction of the dam was started on 1959 and completed in 1964.

References

Dams in Tokushima Prefecture
1964 establishments in Japan